Warren County High School may refer to:

Warren County High School (North Carolina)
Warren County High School (Virginia)
Warren County High School (Georgia)
Warren County High School (Tennessee)